MRCE can refer to:

Manav Rachna College of Engineering
Mitsui Rail Capital Europe

See also
Mrče, village in Serbia